Jean Marc Prado Pingris Jr. (born October 16, 1981) is a Filipino former professional basketball player. Regarded as an all-time great in Philippine basketball, he was named one of the Philippine Basketball Association's 40 Greatest Players.

He spent 14 seasons with the Purefoods franchise where he established his reputation as perhaps the best defender in the PBA for a long period of time and led them  alongside James Yap to four-straight titles and a rare PBA Grand Slam as the San Mig Coffee Mixers in 2013–2014.

Born in Pozorrubio, Pangasinan, Pingris started his career in the PBA being picked third overall at the 2004 PBA draft by FedEx, and was traded to Purefoods after a few games. After spending three years with Purefoods, he was traded to San Miguel and was traded back again after a year.

He represented the Philippines and contributed heavily when they bagged the silver medal in the 2013 FIBA Asia Championship that sent them to the 2014 FIBA World Cup. He currently serves as an assistant coach for the Philippine national team.

Early life and amateur career

Marc Pingris was born on October 16, 1981 to Jean Marc Pingris Sr. and Erlinda Prado, a former saleswoman at SM Cubao. When Pingris was three years old, his father left for work in Morocco and separated from the family.

Pingris idolized Michael Jordan. After his classes, he would study his lessons and do his homework then go to their barangay court to practice his "Jordan-like" skills in basketball. When he had no classes he would call up his friends and play basketball in other barangays. In high school, Pingris tried to play in their school try-outs but he was not accepted, but when he was in 2nd year he was finally accepted to their school's varsity team. During  his collegiate years, he would go play for the varsity basketball team of the Philippine School of Business Administration. However, he started his career at the Far Eastern University, Manila where he was formally discovered.

Struggling financially, he once told in an interview that he had to practically eat left-overs of his teammates because he couldn't afford a meal  and promised himself that he'd be able "to eat a delicious & nice meal someday".

He also played for the Cebu Gems in the Metropolitan Basketball Association and for the Welcoat Paints in the Philippine Basketball League before declaring for the PBA draft.

Professional career

FedEx (2004–2005)
Pingris was selected by the FedEx Express with the 3rd overall pick in the 2004 PBA draft. The draft also featured two of his future teammates, Yap and Artadi from UE.

Pingris played a few games with Air21 prior to the trade that sent him to the Purefoods TJ Hotdogs.

Purefoods (2005–2008)

He was traded to Purefoods after having played a few games with the Express. He was traded along with Egay Billones. In the 2005–06 PBA season, he was awarded with the Finals MVP in the 2006 PBA Philippine Cup as Purefoods defeated Red Bull, 4–2. In Game 2 of the Finals of the 2006 season, he scored 21 points to lead Purefoods to a 93–82 win. In the 2007–08 PBA Philippine Cup Finals, he grabbed a career-high 21 rebounds, leading to his new nickname, The Rebounding Demon.

Magnolia/San Miguel (2008–2009)

When Purefoods center Rommel Adducul was diagnosed with nasopharynx cancer, Pingris was shipped to the Magnolia Beverage Masters for center Enrico Villanueva at the start of the 2008 PBA Fiesta Conference.

Pingris played his first game for Magnolia as a starter, going up against his former team, Purefoods.

Pingris-Santos trade

Before the 2009–10 PBA season began, Pingris and Magnolia teammate Ken Bono were traded to the Burger King Whoppers for superstar Arwind Santos and San Miguel's (formerly Magnolia) 2010 first round pick.

In a Manila Bulletin interview, Burger King team owner Lito Alvarez further explained the trade: “The reason lang natagalan itong negotiation is we want a draft pick, not a player sa package because we already have 17 players including the three picks we’ll have in this Sunday’s Draft.”

Return to Purefoods (2009–2019)

Barely 24 hours after being shipped to Burger King, Pingris was released to the Purefoods TJ Giants after Purefoods agreed to surrender its first and second round picks in 2010 to Burger King.

Pingris' return to Purefoods was confirmed by board governor Rene Pardo in an interview with GMANews.TV: "We have agreed to trade our first and second round picks next year to Burger King for Pingris."

Burger King Whoppers' board representative and then-incoming PBA chairman Lito Alvarez said that he felt that the trade was good for both teams, as Purefoods needed Pingris more, while the Whoppers planned to rebuild with their future draftees.

In the Llamados' second game during the 2012 PBA Commissioner's Cup, Pingris grabbed five rebounds, making him the 42nd member of the league's 1,000 Offensive Rebound Club.

For all his hardwork and contributions in B-Meg's 2012 PBA Commissioner's Cup championship run, Pingris was aptly nicknamed "Pinoy Sakuragi".

Star Hotshots

On October 14, 2016, Pingris was recognized during the PBA Leo Awards Night as he was named to the PBA All-Defensive Team.

Retirement

Pingris was to play for the Magnolia Hotshots in the PBA bubble during the 2020 season which was set up in late 2020 due to the COVID-19 pandemic, but was unable to play for the team due to an injury. Pingris contract with the team expired on December 31, 2020, becoming a restricted free agent. He announced his retirement from competitive basketball in May 2021, after 16 years of playing in the PBA.

On November 24, 2021, Pingris returned to basketball from his brief retirement and signed with the Nueva Ecija Rice Vanguards of the Maharlika Pilipinas Basketball League. However, on December 3, he deferred himself from playing with Nueva Ecija, stating his unreadiness on coming out from his retirement.

Sports administration
In January 2022, Pingris was appointed as commissioner of a newly established league – the Pilipinas Super League.

PBA career statistics

Season-by-season averages

|-
| style="text-align:left;"| 2004–05
| style="text-align:left;"| FedEx
| 55 || 13.6 || .569 || .000 || .548 || 3.1 || .4 || .4 || .4 || 4.6
|-
| style="text-align:left;"| 2005–06
| style="text-align:left;"| Purefoods
| 57 || 27.9 || .515 || .000 || .606 || 8.5 || .9 || .4 || 1.6 || 8.9
|-
| align="left" | 2006–07
| align="left" | Purefoods
| 24 || 29.0 || .588 || .000 || .509 || 9.2 || 1.1 || .5 || 1.3 || 8.1
|-
| align="left" | 2007–08
| align="left" | Purefoods/Magnolia
| 60 || 29.0 || .538 || .000 || .603 || 8.1 || 1.2 || .4 || 1.0 || 8.4
|-
| style="text-align:left;"| 2008–09
| style="text-align:left;"| San Miguel
| 40 || 22.4 || .571 || .000 || .621 || 5.9 || 1.5 || .2 || .7 || 6.8
|-
| align="left" | 2009–10
| align="left" | Purefoods/B-Meg
| 61 || 32.0 || .519 || .000 || .545 || 8.0 || 1.4 || .6 || .7 || 7.3
|-
| align="left" | 2010–11
| align="left" | B-Meg
| 34 || 32.3 || .564 || .000 || .693 || 9.4 || 1.4 || .7 || .9 || 9.8
|-
| align="left" | 2011–12
| align="left" | B-Meg
| 59 || 28.4 || .571 || .000 || .596 || 7.2 || 1.9 || .4 || .6 || 7.3
|-
| align="left" | 2012–13
| align="left" | San Mig Coffee
| 57 || 31.4 || .563 || .000 || .623 || 7.8 || 2.5 || .6 || .9 || 9.2
|-
| align="left" | 2013–14
| align="left" | San Mig Super Coffee
| 68 || 32.8 || .501 || .000 || .615 || 7.4 || 2.7 || .7 || .8 || 9.8
|-
| align="left" | 2014–15
| align="left" | Purefoods/Star
| 43 || 31.3 || .538 || .000 || .631 || 7.2 || 2.5 || .5 || .2 || 7.9
|-
| align="left" | 2015–16
| align="left" | Star
| 35 || 31.0 || .516 || .000 || .607 || 6.8 || 2.1 || .4 || .4 || 9.2
|-
| style="text-align:left;"| 2016–17
| style="text-align:left;"| Star
| 32 || 28.7 || .522 || .000 || .701 || 7.8 || 2.6 || .6 || .9 || 8.1
|-
| style="text-align:left;"| 2017–18
| style="text-align:left;"| Magnolia
| 12 || 31.0 || .485 || .000 || .583 || 9.3 || 3.1 || .7 || 1.1 || 6.7
|-
| style="text-align:left;"| 
| style="text-align:left;"| Magnolia
| 21 || 14.7 || .525 || .000 || .429 || 3.7 || .8 || .3 || .5 || 3.4
|-class=sortbottom
| align="center" colspan=2 | Career
| 658 || 28.0 || .537 || .000 || .602 || 7.3 || 1.7 || .5 || .8 || 7.9

Personal life

Pingris is married to actress Danica Sotto, daughter of Vic Sotto and Dina Bonnevie. They have two children, a son named Jean Michael, and a daughter named Anielle Micaela.

Pingris considers Slam Dunk as his favorite anime and its protagonist Hanamichi Sakuragi his favorite cartoon character, from which he earned the nickname "Sakuragi".

References

External links
Profile at pba.ph

Living people
1981 births
2014 FIBA Basketball World Cup players
Asian Games competitors for the Philippines
Barako Bull Energy draft picks
Barako Bull Energy players
Basketball players at the 2014 Asian Games
Basketball players from Pangasinan
Competitors at the 2003 Southeast Asian Games
FEU Tamaraws basketball players
Filipino men's basketball players
Filipino people of French descent
Ilocano people
Magnolia Hotshots players
Philippine Basketball Association All-Stars
Philippine Basketball Association players with retired numbers
Philippines men's national basketball team players
Power forwards (basketball)
PSBA Jaguars basketball players
San Miguel Beermen players
Marc
Southeast Asian Games gold medalists for the Philippines
Southeast Asian Games medalists in basketball
Filipino men's basketball coaches